The 1994 World Field Archery Championships were held in Vertus, France.

Medal summary (Men's individual)

Medal summary (Women's individual)

Medal summary (Men's Team)

Medal summary (Women's Team)

Medal summary (Juniors)
No Junior Events at this championships.

References

E
1994 in French sport
International archery competitions hosted by France
World Field Archery Championships